Nick Srnicek (born 1982) is a Canadian writer and academic. He is currently a lecturer in Digital Economy in the Department of Digital Humanities, King's College London. Srnicek is associated with the political theory of accelerationism and a post-scarcity economy.

Biography

Srnicek took a double major in Psychology and Philosophy before completing an MA at the University of Western Ontario in 2007. He proceeded to a PhD at the London School of Economics, completing his thesis in 2013 on "Representing complexity: the material construction of world politics". He has worked as a Visiting Lecturer at City University and the University of Westminster.

Bibliography

 (ed., with Levi Bryant and Graham Harman), The Speculative Turn: Continental Materialism and Realism (Re.press, 2011), introduction at https://www.academia.edu/178033
 with Alex Williams, '#ACCELERATE: Manifesto for an accelerationist politics', in Dark Trajectories: Politics of the Outside, ed. by Joshua Johnson (New York: Name Publications, 2013), pp. 135–55, https://www.academia.edu/2379428
 with Alex Williams, 'On Cunning Automata: Financial Acceleration at the Limits of the Dromological', in Collapse 8, ed. by Robin MacKay (Windsor Quary, UK: Urbanomic, 2013), pp. 9–52, https://www.urbanomic.com/book/collapse-8/ 

 Platform Capitalism (Polity, 2016): http://politybooks.com/bookdetail/?isbn=9781509504862
Hester, Helen and Nick Srnicek (2020) After Work: The Fight for Free Time. London: Verso.
Critical studies and reviews of Srnicek's work
 Reviews Inventing the future.
Lowrie, Ian (November 17, 2015). "On Algorithmic Communism". Los Angeles Review Of Books. Reviews Inventing the future.

References

External links
 Academia.edu page
 Verso authors page
 The Guardian profile page

Interviews

 L. Ralón (2011). "Interview with Nick Srnicek," Figure/Ground. December 29.  https://web.archive.org/web/20160716103534/http://figureground.org/interview-with-nick-srnicek/
 C. Derick Varn and Dario Cankovich (2013). 'The Speed of Future Thought: Alex Williams and Nick Srnicek interviewed,' The North Star. July 15. http://www.thenorthstar.info/?p=9240
 Joseph Todd (2016). 'A world without work: an interview with Nick Srnicek, co-author of Inventing the Future', Red Pepper. October 16. http://www.redpepper.org.uk/a-world-without-work-an-interview-with-nick-srnicek-co-author-of-inventing-the-future/
 Laurie Taylor (2017). 'Platform Capitalism', BBC Radio 4. February 27. http://www.bbc.co.uk/programmes/b08fgvln

1982 births
Living people
21st-century Canadian writers
Canadian academics
Critical theorists
Critics of work and the work ethic
Accelerationism